Karen Leibovici (born May 27, 1952) is a politician from Edmonton, Alberta.

Following a career as a social worker, Leibovici was elected to the Legislative Assembly of Alberta in 1993, representing Edmonton Meadowlark as a member of the Alberta Liberal Party. She held that seat for two terms until her defeat in 2001. While MLA, she held the positions of labour critic, health critic, intergovernmental affairs critic and caucus whip.

In the 2001 Edmonton municipal election she was elected to city council, and was subsequently re-elected in 2004 and 2007 for Ward 1 and 2010 for Ward 5. She has served as chair or vice chair of the community services, executive and transportation and public works committees, and the Edmonton Police Commission.

While on the city council, Leibovici was a board member for the Federation of Canadian Municipalities for nine years, and was acclaimed as the president in 2013. She was influential in spearheading the city's 10-year plan to end homelessness, revitalizing retail in west Edmonton, and through the Federation of Canadian Municipalities, brokered a $53 billion infrastructure plan with the federal government for funding municipal projects across the country.

2013 municipal election

Leibovici ran for mayor in Edmonton in 2013, against fellow councillors Don Iveson and Kerry Diotte.

2015 federal election

She was most recently a Liberal Party of Canada candidate in Edmonton West for the 2015 federal election, but lost to Conservative Party candidate Kelly McCauley.

References

1952 births
Living people
Alberta Liberal Party MLAs
Anglophone Quebec people
Edmonton city councillors
Jewish Canadian politicians
Politicians from Montreal
Women MLAs in Alberta
Women municipal councillors in Canada
Candidates in the 2015 Canadian federal election
Alberta candidates for Member of Parliament
21st-century Canadian women politicians
Liberal Party of Canada candidates for the Canadian House of Commons
Jewish women politicians